The Religious Congregations of the Syro-Malabar Catholic Church are divided in Code of Canons of the Oriental Churches as Monasteries, Hermitages, Orders, Congregations, Societies of Common Life in the Manner of Religious, Secular Institutes and Societies of Apostolic Life.

Congregations for priests

Congregations

Carmelites of Mary Immaculate (CMI)
Congregation of Saint Thérèse of Lisieux (CST Fathers)
Missionary Congregation for the Blessed Sacrament (MCBS)
Vincentian Congregation (VC)
OFM. Cap

Monasteries

Benedictine (Annunciation) Order, Kappadu (OSB)
Benedictine (Ottilian) Order (OSB)
Mar Thoma Sliha Monastery (MTSM) Pious Union

Societies of Common Life
Eparchial Society of the Oblates of the Sacred Heart (OSH)

Societies of Apostolic Life
Missionary Society of St Thomas the Apostle (MST)

Congregations for Brothers

Congregations
Catholic Congregation of the Blind (CCB)
Congregation of Saint Thérèse of Lisieux (CST Brothers)
Malabar Missionary Brothers (MMB)

Congregations for Sisters

Monasteries

Nava Jyothi Benedictine Monastery (OSB)
Shanti Nilayam Benedictine Abbey, Order of St. Benedict (OSB)
Snehadeepam Hermitage, Rajkot
Abhishekagni Sisters of Jesus and Mary (ASJM), Sehion Ministries, Attappadi

Congregations

Apostolic Sisters of Mary Immaculate (ASMI)
Assisi Sisters of Mary Immaculate (ASMI) - Green Gardens, Shertallay (1949)
Congregation of Samaritan Sisters (CSS)
Congregation of Sisters of Charity (CSC) 
Congregation of the Sisters of St. Martha (CSM)
Congregation of Holy Family (CHF)
Congregation of the Mother of Carmel (CMC)
Congregation of Preshitharam Sisters (CPS)
Congregation of the Sisters of Nazareth (CSN)
Deen Bandhu Samaj (DBS)
Dominican Sisters of the Holy Trinity (O.P.)
Fervent Daughters of Sacred Heart of Jesus (FDSHJ)
Franciscan Clarist Congregation (FCC) 
Little Servants of the Divine Providence (LSDP)
Little Sisters of St Therese of Lisieux (LST)
Medical Sisters of St Joseph (MSJ)
Missionary Congregation of the Daughters of St. Thomas (DST)
Missionary Sisters of Little Flower (MLF)
Missionary Sisters of Mary Immaculate (MSMI)
Sacred Heart Congregation for Women (Kerala) (SH)
Sadhu Sevana Sabha (SSS)
Sisters of Adoration of the Blessed Sacrament (SABS)
Sisters of Charity of St. John of God (SCJG)
Sisters of the Charity of St. Vincent De Paul (SCV)
Sisters of Jesus (SJ)
Sisters of St Joseph Congregation (SJC)
Sisters of St. Thomas (SST)
Sisters of the Destitute (SD)
Sisters of the Visitation of the Blessed Virgin Mary (SVM)
Snehagiri Missionary Sisters (SMS)
Society of Deva Priya Sisters (DP)
Society of Kristu Dasis (SKD)
Society of Ladies of Mary Immaculate (SLMI)
Society of Nirmala Dasi Sisters (SND)
Sisters of The Poor of St.Catherine of Siena (SAVINA SISTERS)

Pious Unions

Daivadan Sisters (DDS)
Missionary Society of Disciple Sisters of Christ (DSC)
Sisters of St. Joseph the Worker (SSJW)
Society of the Sisters of Bl. Alphonsa (SBA)
St. Martha's Congregation (SMC)

Secular Institutes

Caritas Secular Institute (CS) - Women
Mary Immaculate Secular Institute (MISI) -Women
Servants of our Immaculate Lady (SOIL) - Women
St. Pius X Missionary Society (MSP) - Men
Win Society of Jesus - Women

References

 
Eastern Catholic organizations
Organisation of Catholic religious orders
Eastern Catholic orders and societies